Tombstone Canyon is a 1932 American Western film directed by Alan James.

Plot
The Phantom Killer is on the loose with Ken (Ken Maynard) on his trail.  He in turn is chased by a lynch mob.

Cast 
Ken Maynard as Ken
Tarzan as Tarzan (Ken's horse)
Cecilia Parker as Jenny Lee
Sheldon Lewis as Matt Daley (The Phantom)
Frank Brownlee as Alf Sykes
Jack Clifford as Newt
George Gerwing as Clem Sykes
Lafe McKee as Colonel Lee
Edward Peil Sr. as Sheriff (replaced by Bob Burns)

The film as released on DVD in 2009.

External links 

1932 films
American black-and-white films
1932 Western (genre) films
Films directed by Alan James
American Western (genre) films
Films produced by Samuel Bischoff
1930s English-language films
1930s American films